Lambeth Archives is an archive in South London, managed by the London Borough of Lambeth. Containing records of Lambeth businesses, organisations and individuals, it is housed at the Minet Library on Knatchbull Road. The archive holds various documents for tracing family history, including parish records, electoral registers, civil registers, census returns, poll books, cemetery records, trade and commercial directories, and historic newspapers. The archive is open to the public free of charge.

References

External links
 Official website
 Lambeth Landmark - database of images in Lambeth Archives

Archives in the London Borough of Lambeth
Libraries in the London Borough of Lambeth
History of the London Borough of Lambeth
Tourist attractions in the London Borough of Lambeth